Cyrtodactylus bhupathyi is a species of lizard in the family Gekkonidae. The species is endemic to India.

Etymology
The specific name, bhupathyi, is in honor of Indian herpetologist Subramaniam Bhupathy.

Geographic range
C. bhupathyi is found in West Bengal, East India.

Description

References

Further reading
Agarwal I, Mahony S, Giri VB, Chaitanya R, Bauer AM (2018). "Two new species of bent-toed geckos, Cyrtodactylus Gray, 1827 (Squamata: Gekkonidae) from Northeast India with comments on name-bearing types from the region". Zootaxa 4420 (3): 334–356. (Cyrtodactylus bhupathyi, new species).

Cyrtodactylus
Reptiles described in 2018
Endemic fauna of India
Reptiles of India